Amarte Bien is a studio album recorded by Venezuelan singer-songwriter Carlos Baute. The album was released by Warner Music Spain on November 23, 2010 (see 2010 in music). It was recorded in Mexico City and produced by Juan Carlos Noguel, Armando Ávila and Baute.

Carlos Baute commented that he wanted that "when people listen to my album, they feel happy. They're very fresh songs, that go directly through the heart." Website 7días stated that the singer, with Amarte Bien, "returns to his origins recovering that folklore rhythm from his land, which shot him to fame back in 1994." Mariano Prunes from Allmusic stated that "Amarte Bien is brimming with the light pop and positive messages characteristic of the artist."

The album contained the hit singles "Quién Te Quiere Como Yo", "Amarte Bien" and "Tu Cuerpo Bailando en Mi Cuerpo". "Quién Te Quiere Como Yo" reached No.26 on the Billboard Latin Songs chart and No.6 Latin Pop Songs chart, while the second, "Amarte Bien", also reached No.28 on that list. "Quien Te Quiere Como Yo" also reached No.2 on the Spanish Singles Chart, and "Amarte Bien" reached No.18 on that chart.

Amarte Bien became another commercial success for Carlos Baute. In Spain, the album reached No.3, almost reaching the peak position of its predecessor, De Mi Puño y Letra, which reached No.2. Although, it was a moderate hit in Mexico, only reaching No.39 on the Mexican Albums Chart.

Track listing

Personnel 

Armando Ávila – arrangements, chorus, piano
Iván Barrera – arrangements, soloist, violin
Javo Barrera – drums
Carlos Baute – lead vocals, arrangements, composer, chorus, lyrics
Luis Bustamante – arrangements, chorus
Rene Camacho – chorus
Bernie Grundman – Mastering
Enrique "Bugs" Hernández – drums
Joel Hernández – Bongos, Cajon, Conga, chorus, Djembe, Udu
Roger Hudson – chorus
Juan Carlos Mougel – arrangements, piano
Vanesa Pinedo – chorus
Franklin Rivero – chorus
Txema Rosique – A&R
Sergio "El Guiñapo García" – chorus

Source: Allmusic

Chart performance

Weekly charts

Yearly charts

Release history

References

2010 albums
Warner Music Group albums
Carlos Baute albums
Spanish-language albums